Beate Gertrud Liepert is a research scientist at Columbia University, as well as in North West Research Associates, Redmond and a lecturer at Seattle University. Her research focuses on climate variability: inter-annual changes, centennial time scales, the water and energy cycles.

Education 
Beate got her diploma in Meteorology at the Institute of Meteorology and Institute of Bioclimatology and Air Pollution Research, Ludwig Maximilians University of Munich, Germany. In 1995 she obtained a PhD in Natural Science at the Institute of Meteorology, Department of Physics, Ludwig-Maximilians University Munich, Germany.

Career 
She worked on implications of global dimming for climate: how and to what extend air pollution masks global warming, and how air pollution can  spin down  the  hydrological  cycle  in  a  warmer  and  moister  world. Some  of  her theoretical studies  deal with climate  forcing and  feedbacks as  studied in  models  and observations. She  developed  a  climate  model  evaluation  and ranking   system   that   relies   on   first   physical   principles   and   self-consistency. Aerosol and   solar   radiation measurements in urban, as well as rural environments are also part of her research agenda, as is studying the effects of  light  quality  on  plant  growths and  ecosystems. More  recently  she started applying her knowledge to  solar  energy resource assessments and optimizing photovoltaic systems as alternative to fossil fuel and nuclear technologies.

Beate contributed a section on global dimming to the Intergovernmental Panel on Climate Change 4th Assessment Report “Scientific Basis” (chapter 3.4.4.2) that won the 2007 Nobel Peace Prize.

Awards 
WINGS World Quest “Women of Discovery” Earth Award 2016

Distinguished Guest Lecturer Environmental and Urban Studies Bard College, Annandale-on-Hudson, NY, March 2015

Publications 
 Liepert, B.G. "Observed reductions of surface solar radiation at sites in the United States and worldwide from 1961 to 1990" Geophysical Research Letters, 29 (10), 611-614, 2002. 
 Liepert,B.G.; Feichter, J.; Lohmann, U.; Roeckner, E. "Can aerosols spin down the water cycle in a warmer and moister world?" Geophysical Research Letters 31, (6), 2004. 
 Feichter, J.; Roeckner, E.; Lohmann, U.; Liepert, B. "Nonlinear aspects of the climate response to greenhouse gas and aerosol forcing" Journal of Climate 17 (12), 2384-2398, 2004. 
 Previdi, M.; Liepert, B. G. "Annular modes and Hadley cell expansion under global warming" Geophysical Research Letters 34 (22), 2007. 
 D'Arrigo, R.; Wilson, R.; Liepert, B.; Cherubini, P. "On the divergence problem in northern forests: a review of the tree-ring evidence and possible causes," Global and Planetary Change,60 (3-4), 289-305, 2008. 
 Liepert, B.G.; Previdi, M. "Do models and observations disagree on the rainfall response to global warming?" Journal of Climate 22 (11), 3156-3166, 2009. 
 Liepert, B. G.; Previdi, M. "Inter-model variability and biases of the global water cycle in CMIP3 coupled climate models," Environmental Research Letters, v.7, 2012. doi:doi:10.1088/1748-9326/7/1/014006
 Liepert, B.G.; Lo, F. "CMIP5 update of ‘Inter-model variability and biases of the global water cycle in CMIP3 coupled climate models’" Environmental Research Letters 8 (2), 029401, 2013. 
 Liepert, B.; Fabian, P.; Grassl, H. "Solar radiation in Germany-observed trends and an assessment of their causes" Contributions to atmospheric physics 67 (1), 15-29, 1994.

References

1963 births
German climatologists
Women climatologists
German meteorologists
Ludwig Maximilian University of Munich alumni
Columbia University faculty
21st-century women scientists
Living people